Painkiller Jane is a fictional superhero created by Jimmy Palmiotti and Joe Quesada for Event Comics in 1995. Originally a five-issue mini-series, the character went on to star in numerous crossover titles with the likes of the Punisher, Vampirella, and Hellboy.

After Event comics, the character was exclusively written by Jimmy Palmiotti and drawn by various artists as it jumped from publisher to publisher. The series relaunched at Dynamite Entertainment with the first mini-series selling out. After that Icon- an independent label for creator owned work at Marvel comics, published two mini-series. The character then came back to PaperFilms, a company owned by Jimmy Palmiotti and Amanda Conner where it is currently published. Painkiller Jane has been published all over the world in at least 8 languages to date. The comics have been the basis for a television film and series.

Fictional character history

Jane Vasko begins as an undercover police officer attempting to infiltrate the Fonti Mob. After gaining the trust of mob boss Joey Fonti, she is given the assignment of passing a message on to rival gang member Adam, not realizing that an explosive device has been planted on her. As she meets her target, the explosion causes significant injuries, but Adam is uninjured. Through mysterious means, he manages to revive Jane, giving her superhuman regenerative powers in the process. Leaving her life as a police officer behind, she becomes the vigilante Painkiller Jane.

The validity of this origin is unclear, as a completely different origin has been presented in the first Painkiller Jane miniseries, and the Dynamite Comics' miniseries contain references to both versions of the characters' origin.

Powers and abilities
Jane Vasko is virtually indestructible. With Jane's exceptional regenerative abilities, minor injuries heal in seconds, and do not even slow her down; more major ones tend to take a few minutes. She has recovered from multiple gunshot wounds, explosions, chemical weapons assault, axes buried in her spine, even a shotgun blast to the face (which simply knocked her off her feet for a bit). However, the healing power does not stop the injuries from hurting, which is where her new name came from. On the offensive side, she has no real powers except for being a tough woman to kill. Other than that, she is a skilled fighter and master of undefined martial arts, as well as a master marksman with her weapons of choice, a pair of handguns.

Bibliography
22 Brides #1-4 (Mar. 1996 - Jan. 1997)
Painkiller Jane #0-5 (Jan. - Nov. 1997) (#0 printed in Jan. 1999)
Painkiller Jane vol. 2, #1-3 (Mar. - Aug. 2006)
Painkiller Jane vol. 3, #0-5 (Apr. 2007 - Mar. 2008)
Painkiller Jane: The Price of Freedom #1-4 (Nov. 2013 - Jan. 2014)
Painkiller Jane: The 22 Brides #1-3 (May - Oct. 2014)
Painkiller Jane: Trust The Universe graphic novel (Aug. 2019)

Crossovers
Ash/22 Brides #1-2 (Dec. 1996 - Apr. 1997)
The Ash Files #1 (Mar. 1997)
Painkiller Jane vs. Darkness #1 (Apr. 1997)
Vampirella: Crossover Gallery #1 (September 1997) (pin-up only)
No Justice, No Piece #1 (October 1997) (short-story anthology; back inside pin-up only)
Vampirella/Painkiller Jane #1 (May 1998)
Painkiller Jane/Hellboy #1 (Aug. 1998)
Painkiller Jane/Darkchylde #1 (Oct. 1998)
The Punisher/Painkiller Jane #1 (Jan. 2001)
Terminator 2 #6-7 (Jan. - Mar. 2008) (crossover with vol. 3 #4-5)
The CBLDF Presents: Liberty Comics #2 (Oct. 2009) (short-story anthology)

In other media

Television

 Painkiller Jane was made into a made-for-television movie and broadcast on the Sci-Fi Channel in December 2005. The film stars Emmanuelle Vaugier as Jane Browning. The film differed significantly from the comics, notably in regard to the character's origin, but led to a subsequent television series.

 The Sci-Fi Channel original series based on the character starred Kristanna Loken as Jane Vasco. The series' pilot aired in Friday, April 13, 2007. The name of the heroine in the show was more similar to the original comic name of Jane Vasko, as opposed to the Jane Browning character from the television film. The series received lukewarm reviews. Painkiller Jane did not return for a second season. The final episode aired on September 21, 2007.

References

External links

Painkiller Jane comics at Dynamite Entertainment

 
Comics characters introduced in 1996
Comics characters with accelerated healing
1997 comics debuts
Dynamite Entertainment characters
Dynamite Entertainment titles
Fictional bisexual females
Fictional women soldiers and warriors
LGBT superheroes
American comics adapted into films
Comics adapted into television series
Icon Comics titles
Vigilante characters in comics